Zakhar is a given name, the East Slavic form of the biblical name Zechariah or Zachary. Notable people with the name include:

Zakhar Arzamastsev (born 1992), Russian ice hockey player
Zakhar Bron (born 1947), Russian violinist and violin pedagogue of Jewish descent
Zakhar Chernyshyov (1722–1784), Russian field marshal in charge of the College of War from 1763 to 1774
Zakhar Dubensky (born 1978), association football midfielder from Russia
Zakhar Kalashov, notorious gangster and thief in law in the Russian-Georgian Mafia
Zakhar May (born 1969), modern Russian musician, author of many hits
Zakhar Pashutin (born 1974), Russian professional basketball coach and former player
Zakhar Prilepin (born 1975), Russian writer, political dissident, member of Russia's unregistered National Bolshevik Party since 1996

See also
Zechariah (given name)
Zakar (disambiguation)
Zakharenko
Zakharov
Zaqar

Russian masculine given names